Today FM is a nationwide Auckland-based New Zealand talkback, news and sport radio network owned and operated by MediaWorks New Zealand.

It was formed by the 2022 rebrand of Magic Talk and competes directly against NZME station Newstalk ZB.

History

In November 2021, MediaWorks announced it would replace Magic Talk with a new talk radio network called Today FM. Newshub's political editor at the time, Tova O'Brien, was announced as breakfast host, with broadcasters Duncan Garner, Rachel Smalley, Polly Gillespie, Leah Panapa, Mark Richardson, Lloyd Burr, Wilhelmina Shrimpton, Nigel Yalden, Robett Hollis, Mark Dye, Carly Flynn, Nickson Clark, Dave Letele and Dominic Bowden all named as part of the lineup.

The Today FM brand name has been used in other regions such as 89.3 Today FM which was founded as a local station in the Wairarapa by Paul Henry in 1991 and Today 92FM (later Today 99.8FM) which was a local station in Auckland during the 1990s.

Today FM was launched on 21 March 2022 and commenced broadcasting on the former Magic Talk frequencies, plus 90.2 FM in Auckland (moving The Rock to 106.2 FM) and 95.3 FM in Christchurch (moving Mai FM to the low-power frequency of 106.8 FM). The first programme to be aired on the station was First Light, presented by Rachel Smalley.

News bulletins

News and sports bulletins are broadcast live every hour, on the hour, and produced in a shorter, snappier format with headline summaries as the major stories develop. The news is provided by the station's own newsroom with over 20 news and sports journalists, editors and correspondents. Network newsreaders include Carly Flynn (breakfast) and Wilhelmina Shrimpton (drive), with Bridget Hastie, Geoff Bryan, Aroha Hathaway, Angie Skerrett, Brin Rudkin, KM Adams and Mel Homer.

Frequencies
Today FM is broadcast on the following frequencies:

 Mid-Northland - 100.7 FM
 Whangarei - 90.8 FM
 Auckland - 90.2 FM & 702 AM
 Waikato - 100.2 FM
 Tauranga - 100.6 FM
 Whakatane - 92.1 FM
 Rotorua - 95.1 FM
 Reporoa - 98.0 FM
 Gisborne - 94.9 FM
 Hawke's Bay - 106.3 FM
 Whanganui - 96.0 FM
 Manawatu - 93.8 FM
 Kapiti/Horowhenua - 99.1 FM
 Wairarapa - 98.3 FM
 Wellington - 98.9 FM & 1233 AM
 Nelson - 96.0 FM
 Blenheim - 95.3 FM
 Picton - 92.3 FM
 Kaikoura -  89.1 FM
 Westport - 90.1 FM
 Christchurch - 95.3 FM & 738 AM
 Timaru - 105.9 FM
 Mackenzie Country (Tekapo and Twizel) - 91.0 FM
 Oamaru - 100.8 FM
 Alexandra - 95.9 FM
 Dunedin - 96.6 FM
 Queenstown - 91.2 FM
 Southland - 94.0 FM

References

External links
Today FM website

 
2022 establishments in New Zealand
Radio stations established in 2022